Quarry Township is one of eleven townships in Jersey County, Illinois, United States.  As of the 2010 census, its population was 1,174 and it contained 610 housing units.

History
The name of Quarry Township was changed from Grafton Township on April 1, 1880.

Geography

Cities, towns, villages
 Grafton

Adjacent townships
 Otter Creek Township (northeast)
 Elsah Township (east)
 Rosedale Township (northwest)

Cemeteries
The township contains these two cemeteries: Hartford and Scenic Hill.

Major highways
  Illinois Route 3
  Illinois Route 100

Airports and landing strips
 Department of Corrections heliport

Rivers
 Illinois River

Lakes
 Gilbert Lake
 Lower Stump Lake

Landmarks
 Pere Marquette State Park

Demographics

School districts
 Jersey Community Unit School District 100

Political districts
 Illinois' 17th congressional district
 State House District 97
 State Senate District 49

References
 
 United States Census Bureau 2007 TIGER/Line Shapefiles
 United States National Atlas

External links
 City-Data.com
 Illinois State Archives

Townships in Jersey County, Illinois
Townships in Illinois